The men's 100 metre butterfly swimming competition at the 2002 Asian Games in Busan was held on 3 October at the Sajik Swimming Pool.

Schedule
All times are Korea Standard Time (UTC+09:00)

Records

Results 
Legend
DNS — Did not start

Heats

Finals

Final B

Final A

References 

2002 Asian Games Report, Pages 190–191
Results

Swimming at the 2002 Asian Games